Sleeping at the Starlite Motel: and Other Adventures on the Way Back Home is a 1995 collection of essays by Bailey White.

Essay collections
1995 books